Alukian or Alhukheck is a village in the Nicobar district of Andaman and Nicobar Islands, India. It is located in the Nancowry tehsil, on the Kamorta Island.

Demographics 

According to the 2011 census of India, Alukian/Alhukheck has 10 households. The effective literacy rate (i.e. the literacy rate of population excluding children aged 6 and below) is 62.16%.

References 

Villages in Nancowry tehsil